RNAS Donibristle is a former Fleet Air Arm base located  east of Rosyth, Fife, and  northwest of Edinburgh.

From 1918 to 1939 the station was called RAF Donibristle.

History
The following units were posted here at some point:
Royal Air Force

Fleet Air Arm

Current use
The site is now a combination of Donibristle Industrial Park and Hillend Industrial Park.

See also
 List of former Royal Air Force stations
 List of air stations of the Royal Navy

References

Citations

Bibliography

Defunct airports in Scotland
Airports established in 1916
RNAS